Sue or Susan Hamilton may refer to:

Sue Hamilton (archaeologist), British specialist in prehistory
Sue Hamilton (actress) (1945–1969), American model and actress
Susan Hamilton (soprano) (born 1970), Scottish singer
Susan Hamilton, Duchess of Hamilton, wife of Alexander Hamilton, 10th Duke of Hamilton
Lady Susan Hamilton (1814–1889), daughter of Susan Hamilton, Duchess of Hamilton

See also 
Suzy Hamilton, runner